The 2008 Country Music Association Awards, 42nd Annual Ceremony,  was held on November 12, 2008, at the Sommet Center (later the Bridgestone Arena) in Nashville, Tennessee and was hosted by CMA Award winners Brad Paisley and Carrie Underwood. Kenny Chesney and Sugarland led the night with 6 nomination each.

Winners and nominees

Winners are shown in bold.

Hall of Fame

Performers

Presenters 

Vince Gill - recognized the Country Music Hall of Fame Inductees

References 

Country Music Association
CMA
Country Music Association Awards
Country Music Association Awards
November 2008 events in the United States
2008 awards in the United States
21st century in Nashville, Tennessee
Events in Nashville, Tennessee